Cable Head Airpark  is located  northwest of Cable Head, Prince Edward Island, Canada. It is a seasonal airport, with no winter snow removal and soft surfaces during the summer thaw. Prior permission is required.

References

Registered aerodromes in Prince Edward Island
Transport in Kings County, Prince Edward Island
Buildings and structures in Kings County, Prince Edward Island